Josiah Johnson Hawes (1808–1901) was a photographer in Boston, Massachusetts. He and Albert Southworth established the photography studio of Southworth & Hawes, which produced numerous portraits of exceptional quality in the 1840s–1860s.

Biography

J.J. Hawes was born in Wayland, Massachusetts in 1808. He began his career as a portrait painter. He then studied photography in Boston with Francis Fauvel-Gouraud.

In 1843 Hawes and Southworth formed the partnership of Southworth & Hawes, with studios on Tremont Row, in Boston's Scollay Square. The studio produced daguerreotype portraits of many notables, including Lemuel Shaw, Henry Wadsworth Longfellow, Daniel Webster, and others. The studio rooms overlooked "a fine orchard, belonging to the Gardiner Greene estate. From these windows, facing Scollay Sq., we looked on the church and gardens of Brattle Street"

In 1849 Hawes married Nancy Stiles Southworth (Albert’s sister). They had three children: Alice, Marion and Edward.

After the partnership with Southworth dissolved in 1863, Hawes continued as a photographer on Tremont Row for several decades, through the 1890s. In his later years he was known as the "oldest working photographer in this country."

Image gallery

References

Further reading
 Treasures in Pictures; Many Famous Photographs Made by the Veteran Josiah Johnson Hawes. Boston Daily Globe, Feb 21, 1898. p. 9.
 Josiah Johnson Hawes, dies in his ninety-fourth year. Boston Transcript, Aug.9, 1901.
 Oldest Photographer Dead; He Was Josiah Johnson Hawes, Friend of Dickens, Rufus Choate, and Gen. Benjamin F. Butler. New York Times, Aug 10, 1901. p. 7.

External links

 WorldCat. Hawes, Josiah Johnson 1808-1901
 Boston Public Library on Flickr. Josiah Johnson Hawes Photographs
 Museum of Fine Arts, Boston, works by J.J. Hawes
 Boston Athenaeum, works by J.J. Hawes.
 George Eastman House, on Flickr, works by Southworth & Hawes
 International Center of Photography, 2005 exhibition of Southworth & Hawes
 Metropolitan Museum of Art, works by J.J. Hawes

Commercial photographers
Pioneers of photography
1808 births
1901 deaths
Artists from Boston
Phillips Academy alumni
19th century in Boston
19th-century American photographers